Graeme McCarrel (born November 27, 1960) is a Canadian curler from Brampton, Ontario. He is a former Brier and World Champion.

In 1980, as a junior, McCarrel played third for John Kawaja. They lost in the finals of the Canadian Junior Curling Championships that year. After juniors, McCarrel moved to play with veteran Paul Savage. McCarrel won his first provincial title in 1988, playing second for Savage.

McCarrel then moved to play third for Wayne Middaugh.  With Middaugh, McCarrel won three more provincial championships, in 1998, 2001 and 2005. In 1998 the team won the Brier, and the World Curling Championships.

McCarrel would later leave the Middaugh rink. In 2008, he was picked up to play with Middaugh's cousin, Peter Corner to play as his third.

References

External links
 Brampton Sports Hall of Fame
 

Sportspeople from Brampton
Living people
Brier champions
World curling champions
Curlers from Ontario
Canadian male curlers
1960 births
Canada Cup (curling) participants